Fu Yu (born 22 July 1988), known professionally as Wuheqilin is a Chinese illustrator and political cartoonist. His hometown is Harbin. He claims himself as a "Wolf warrior painter" and is famous in China for his artwork Peace Force, which depicts an Australian soldier killing an Afghan child.

Biography 
Since his grandparents were soldiers in the Korean War, Wuheqilin became a patriot when he was young. After graduating from a university in Changchun with a degree in art and design, Wuheqilin served as an intern in an animation and film production company in Beijing in 2009. Later, a director left the company and created his own studio,  with whom Wuheqilin worked in Zhongguancun. At the end of 2013, he was invited to Shanghai Film Art Academy (:zh:上海电影艺术学院) to give a lecture on computer graphics, and started a painting training institute called "Wuhe" in early 2014.

After Chinese consumers started threatening to boycott H&M, Nike and other brands that have joined a call to avoid using cotton produced in Xinjiang, Wuheqilin published his new artwork Blood Cotton Initiative to criticize the Better Cotton Initiative.

Significant works 
A dispute between China and Australia arose in 2020 when a member of China's foreign ministry posted online a picture of Wuheqilin's image Peace Force, which depicts an Australian soldier preparing to slit an Afghan child's throat. The image is a reference to the Brereton Report, which found that Australian troops had illegally killed more than three dozen Afghan civilians. Australian Prime Minister Scott Morrison demanded an apology, which China declined to give. Wuheqilin then created another image mocking Morrison. 

After the May 2021 Group of Seven (G7) Foreign Ministers meeting, Wuheqilin created an image satirized a photograph of G7 officials by portraying them in old-style military uniforms. Wuheqilin wrote, "The last time when these guys colluded to [suppress] China was in 1900; 120 years have passed, they are still dreaming." The image went viral on social media.

Reception 
Academic Suisheng Zhao describes Wuheqilin as having made his reputation "with his scathing images of the United States as a blood-soaked, irrational, medieval realm[.]"

Following Wuheqilin's image satirizing the G7 Foreign Ministers, Chinese Communist Party-owned tabloid Global Times praised Wuheqilin as a Chinese patriot.

Gallery

References

External link
 

Chinese illustrators
1988 births
Living people